The 1946 World Archery Championships was the 10th edition of the event. It was held in Stockholm, Sweden on 6–11 August 1946 and was organised by World Archery Federation (FITA).

Due to the Second World War, this was the first edition of World Championships since 1939.

Medals summary

Recurve

Medals table

References

External links
 World Archery website
 Complete results

World Championship
World Archery
World Archery Championships
International archery competitions hosted by Sweden
International sports competitions in Stockholm
1940s in Stockholm